Dibujando el cielo is a 2018 Mexican romantic comedy film directed by Ana Laura Calderón. The film premiered on 31 August 2018, and is stars Maite Perroni, Iván Sánchez, and Christian Vázquez.

Plot 
Throughout her life, Sofía (Maite Perroni) has tried to stay away from commitments and routines. As one of the youngest and most successful astrophysicists, she has dedicated her attention and energy in space and the sky, without paying attention to things like love or company. Among her various investigations, Sofia begins to identify chaotic elements of space and its operation with her own personal and professional life. The situation will get complicated when she meet Gerardo (Christian Vásquez), a colleague from the institute who seems to have the opposite elements to her. However, understanding the laws of the universe, Sofia will begin to want to solve her life and her new relationship with Gerardo following the same principles she uses to solve her work. Gradually, the girl's attention will move away from space and focus on what is around her. And although everything looks like a fairy tale, she won't be able to decide between two loves that could balance her life and her work.

Cast 
 Maite Perroni as Sofía
 Iván Sánchez as Raúl
 Christian Vásquez as Gerardo
 Claudia Ramírez as Marifer
 Ximena Romo as Marla
 Ana Layevska as Silvia

References

External links 
 

2018 romantic comedy films
Mexican romantic comedy films
2010s Spanish-language films
2010s Mexican films